Manuel Fettner (born 17 June 1985) is an Austrian ski jumper. He won a silver medal on the normal hill at the 2022 Winter Olympics and a gold medal with the Team at the 2013 World Ski Championships.

References

1985 births
Living people
Austrian male ski jumpers
FIS Nordic World Ski Championships medalists in ski jumping
Sportspeople from Vienna
Universiade medalists in ski jumping
Olympic ski jumpers of Austria
Ski jumpers at the 2018 Winter Olympics
Ski jumpers at the 2022 Winter Olympics
Olympic gold medalists for Austria
Olympic silver medalists for Austria
Olympic medalists in ski jumping
Medalists at the 2022 Winter Olympics
Universiade gold medalists for Austria
Competitors at the 2005 Winter Universiade
21st-century Austrian people